Serranillus is a genus of ground beetles in the family Carabidae. There are at least three described species in Serranillus, found in the United States.

Species
These three species belong to the genus Serranillus:
 Serranillus dunavani (Jeannel, 1963)
 Serranillus jeanneli Barr, 1995
 Serranillus septentrionis Sokolov & Carlton, 2008

References

Trechinae